Terracini is a surname. It is the surname of:
 (1889–1968), Italian mathematician
Catherine Terracini (born c. 1982), Italian-born Australian actress, daughter of Lyndon
Lyndon Terracini (born 1950), Australian opera singer and director
Paul Terracini (born 1957), Australian composer and conductor
Roberto Terracini (born 1900), Italian sculptor
Susanna Terracini (born 1963), English-born Italian mathematician
Umberto Terracini (1895–1983), president of the Constituent Assembly of Italy